Penicillium resticulosum is an anamorph species of fungus in the genus Penicillium which produces notatin.

References

Further reading 
 
 

resticulosum
Fungi described in 1942